Manfred Stumpf (born November 25, 1957, in Alsfeld, Hesse) is a German draftsman, conceptual artist, and digital artist. He started to study 1976 with Thomas Bayrle at the Städelschule in Frankfurt am Main, since 1978 with Hans Haake at the Cooper Union in New York, and since 1979 with Bazon Brock at the University of Applied Arts in Vienna, Austria. He currently resides in Romrod in the Vogelsbergkreis and Frankfurt, Germany.

In 1995, Stumpf became professor for figure drawing and conceptual drawing in the faculty for Visual Communication and is leading interdisciplinary projects with Prof. Dieter Mankau at the HfG Offenbach.

Works 
"Searching for a mandatory, symbolic visual depiction, Stumpf discovered early Christianity and the Byzantine Art. He uses these conventionalized symbols for his art and fills them with actual topics."

Stumpf's developed icon "Entry into Jerusalem" (1986) emerged from there and has been sent—during the project "Contempler"—in a container around the world and is still varied by him until today.

Right from the start, Stumpf used the technical pen Rotring to work on his clear, flawless and filigree A-4-drawings. As to develop new visual depictions, he used a computer later as well—e.g. the screensaver Angeline (1994/96)—and so moved into a "spiritual/virtual" world.

In 1987, he dissolved the element of the palm leaf from his icon and transferred it onto wooden objects, covered them with red paint and placed them in his hometown Alsfeld on an acre, near the Autobahn A5 as hieratic signs.

The donkey from "Entry into Jerusalem" lives an independent life as a motif as well, for example on the huge mosaic at the underground station Habsburgerallee in Frankfurt am Main, where he carries a clock, a computer display or an atomic nucleus. The mosaic was created in 1992 and displays 66 donkeys on a ca. 7874-inch wall area.

In 2005, Stumpf created a stained glass window for the Waldhufen church in Winterkasten (Germany), which represents the "Resurrection of Jesus at Easter". The colors of the window "symbolize the transition from the dark to the light in everybodys life."

For the year 2021 Manfred Stumpf plans to present Jesus' parable "A camel is more likely to go through the eye of a needle than for a rich man to enter the Kingdom of God" before the European Central Bank. A steel needle is said to protrude 23 meters above the ECB, in front of which a bronze camel will sit. When viewed from above, the needle should look like an upturned palm tree and thus symbolize the Tree of life or the Kingdom of God, Eternity. The sculpture "Camel and Eye of the Needle" should be walkable and thus experienceable.

There is a long tradition to the usage of the line. We can track it from the Egyptian Hieroglyphs with its clear and sharp outlines to Middle Age Paintings, along drawings of Romanticism, the Pop Art, until today.

Scholarships 
 1991 Stipendium der Agency for Cultural Affairs (Bunkacho), Tokyo
 1989 Villa Massimo, Rome
 1985 Stipendium für junge Bildende Künstler, Alsfeld
 1982 Jahresstipendium der Frankfurter Künstlerhilfe e.V.

Awards 
 1988 Reinhold Kurt-Kunstpreis der Frankfurter Sparkasse
 2015 Marielies Hess-Kunstpreis

Exhibitions (selection)

Collections (selection)
 Artothek Nuremberg
 Sammlung Hanck, Düsseldorf
 Deutsche Bank, Frankfurt am Main
 Museum für Moderne Kunst (MMK), Frankfurt am Main
 Museum Folkwang, Essen
 Sammlung zeitgenössischer Kunst der Bundesrepublik Deutschland, Bonn

See also 
 Palm Sunday

Bibliography
 Manfred Stumpf, Jean-Christoph Amman (Hrsg.), Museum für Moderne Kunst, Frankfurt am Main, "Sketchbook for the icon 'Entry into Jerusalem'", Cantz Verlag, Ostfildern, 1996, 
 Manfred Stumpf, "OKTOGON", Museum Wiesbaden, Wiesbaden, 1987
 Manfred Stumpf; Thomas Trescher, "Palm", Edition Wilk, Frankfurt am Main, 1987
 Manfred Stumpf, "Manfred Stumpf, Der heilige Kosmonaut, Zeichnungen", Frankfurter Kunstverein, Frankfurt am Main, 1985?
 Manfred Stumpf, "Der heilige Kosmonaut, Zeichnungen", Edition Wilk, Frankfurt am Main, 1984
 Domenig, Krüger, Sanovec, Sommer, Stumpf, "Domenig, Krüger, Sanovec, Sommer, Stumpf: Malerei, Zeichnung, Film", Galerie Ak, Frankfurt am Main, 1983
 Hendricks, Deren, Stumpf, "Zeichnungen von Hendricks, Deren, Stumpf", Museum am Ostwall, Dortmund, 1985

Notes

External links 

 Prof. Manfred Stumpf at the HfG of Main
 "Manfred Stumpf at the Church of Christ in Bad Vilbel", Art in Churches, 2011
 Rainer Lind, Interview with Manfred Stumpf (Video in German language), August 2014
 "Manfred Stumpf Enter Jerusalem", Saint Louis University, MOCRA, September-November 1997

1957 births
Living people
People from Alsfeld
German contemporary artists
German conceptual artists
German digital artists
German draughtsmen